Planet of the Apps is an American reality television show broadcast on Apple Music (predating the 2019 launch of Apple TV+). It was the first original television show produced by Apple. On July 23, 2018, it was announced that Apple had canceled the series after one season.

Episode style
On each of the episodes, software makers have 60 seconds to pitch their idea in front of the advisors (Jessica Alba, Gwyneth Paltrow, will.i.am and Gary Vaynerchuk) on a slow-moving escalator—for a visual idea of an "elevator pitch". New episodes were released on Tuesdays, with the first season being 10 episodes long. The series is hosted by Zane Lowe and produced by Ben Silverman. The series premiered on June 6, 2017.

Critique
The Guardian found the show "boring and self-indulgent," "painful," "a sort of vicarious embarrassment," and "grating."

Season premiere
The premiere episode debuted the following apps:

 SILO – Focus and Study Timer
 Companion: Mobile Personal Safety 
 Pair – Showroom to your home
 Dote – The Mobile Mall
 Tracks Battle Squad
 Twist – Live events with a dating Twist
 Skootch: The Word Game

Episodes
Source:

References

External links

2017 American television series debuts
2017 American television series endings
2010s American reality television series
English-language television shows
Business-related television series
Apple TV+ original programming